S. Saiduzzaman is an Indian politician, belonging to Indian National Congress. In the 1999 election he was elected to the Lok Sabha from Muzaffarnagar (Lok Sabha constituency). He was elected to the 9th Uttar Pradesh Assembly from Morna (Assembly constituency). He also served as the Minister of State for Home Affairs in N. D. Tiwari and Vir Bahadur Singh cabinet.

Positions held

Elections contested

References

External links
 Loksabha Profile

India MPs 1999–2004
Lok Sabha members from Uttar Pradesh
People from Muzaffarnagar district
1945 births
Living people
Indian National Congress politicians from Uttar Pradesh
Indian National Congress politicians